Gemze de Lappe (February 28, 1922, Portsmouth, Virginia – November 11, 2017 Manhattan) was an American dancer who worked very closely with Agnes de Mille and was frequently partnered by de Mille's favorite male dancer, James Mitchell.

Born to  daughter of Birch Wood de Lappe (an actor and teacher) and his wife, Maureen (an actress and drummer; maiden name, McDonough), Gemze attended Hunter College and  the Ballet Arts School at Carnegie Hall. Originally trained by Irma Duncan and Michel Fokine, de Lappe began her career in Fokine's company. Her Broadway musical theatre performance credits include Simon of Legree in the original production of The King and I (also in the film version), Paint Your Wagon (Donaldson Award winner), Juno, and The American Dance Machine. She appeared in the original West End and first national companies of Oklahoma!, dancing the iconic role of Laurey in the "Dream Ballet". In the early 1950s, she briefly formed part of a dance team with Dean Crane.  De Lappe's long concert dance career included engagements with American Ballet Theatre and the Agnes de Mille Dance Theatre. For several years, she was a professor of dance at Smith College, and has held a number of visiting appointments since her nominal retirement.  In 1989, Niagara University awarded her an honorary doctorate.

De Lappe died on 11 November 2017, up to which time she remained active as a choreographer and teacher; now, she remains  especially well known for reconstructing the work of de Mille, Isadora Duncan, and Jerome Robbins. She recreated de Mille's choreography for the 1979 Broadway revival of Oklahoma! and choreographed Abe Lincoln in Illinois on Broadway. She regularly traveled the country, recreating the original choreography for such shows as The King and I, Oklahoma!, Brigadoon, and Carousel for various professional, regional, and educational theatre companies. In Spring 2011, the University of North Carolina School of the Arts presented an accurate recreation of the original Broadway production of Oklahoma! with the original choreography recreated by De Lappe.

In 2007, she was awarded Tony Honors for Excellence in Theatre. In 2012, she received the Martha Hill Dance Fund Lifetime Achievement Award.

References

Further reading
 "Birch DeLappe of the Big Bill Bittner Company". McAlester News Capital. December 2, 1909. p. 9

External links
 
 
 2007 performance of Agnes de Mille's "Come to Me, Bend to Me," staged by de Lappe at Jacob's Pillow Dance
 2007 interview about The King and I
 2008 interview about aging and her career
 2013 interview about Oklahoma! in The Huffington Post
 2015 interview about Paint Your Wagon on the New York City Center blog

1922 births
2017 deaths
American ballerinas
American choreographers
American musical theatre actresses
Hunter College alumni
People from Portsmouth, Virginia
21st-century American women
20th-century American ballet dancers